Eupnigodes megocephala, the big-headed grasshopper, is a species of slant-faced grasshopper in the family Acrididae. It is found in the western United States

References

Gomphocerinae
Articles created by Qbugbot
Beetles described in 1897